Gurnang is a small rural locality  south of Oberon in the Oberon Shire, part of the Central Tablelands region of New South Wales, Australia.

The Oberon Correctional Centre is within in the locality; 100% of the population recorded at the 2016 Census was male; with a median age of 24.

Climate

References

Central Tablelands
Oberon Council
Towns in New South Wales